Bowman Peninsula is a peninsula,  long in a north–south direction and  wide in its northern and central portions, lying between Nantucket Inlet and Gardner Inlet on the east coast of Palmer Land. The peninsula is ice covered and narrows toward the south, terminating in Cape Adams. It was discovered by the Ronne Antarctic Research Expedition, 1947–48, under Finn Ronne, who named it for Isaiah Bowman.

References
 

Peninsulas of Palmer Land